The following is a list of Dendrobium species accepted by the World Checklist of Selected Plant Families at October 2018.

A

 Dendrobium abbreviatum Schltr.
 Dendrobium aberrans Schltr.
 Dendrobium abhaycharanii (Phukan & A.A.Mao) Schuit. & Peter B.Adams
 Dendrobium acaciifolium J.J.Sm.
 Dendrobium acanthophippiiflorum J.J.Sm.
 Dendrobium acerosum Lindl.
 Dendrobium aciculare Lindl.
 Dendrobium acinaciforme Roxb.
 Dendrobium aclinia Rchb.f.
 Dendrobium acuiferum Ormerod
 Dendrobium acuminatissimum (Blume) Lindl.
 Dendrobium acutifolium Ridl.
 Dendrobium acutilingue Schuit. & Peter B.Adams
 Dendrobium acutilobum Schltr.
 Dendrobium acutimentum J.J.Sm.
 Dendrobium acutisepalum J.J.Sm.
 Dendrobium adae F.M.Bailey – slender cane orchid
 Dendrobium adamsii A.D.Hawkes
 Dendrobium aduncilobum J.J.Sm.
 Dendrobium aduncum Lindl.
 Dendrobium aemulum R.Br. – ironbark feather orchid
 Dendrobium aethalodes Ormerod
 Dendrobium affine (Decne.) Steud. – white butterfly orchid
 Dendrobium agamense J.J.Sm.
 Dendrobium agrostophylloides Schltr.
 Dendrobium agrostophyllum F.Muell. – buttercup orchid
 Dendrobium agusanense Ames
 Dendrobium ajoebii J.J.Sm.
 Dendrobium alabense J.J.Wood
 Dendrobium alaticaulinum P.Royen
 Dendrobium albayense Ames
 Dendrobium albiflorum Ridl.
 Dendrobium albopurpureum (Seidenf.) Schuit. & Peter B.Adams
 Dendrobium albosanguineum Lindl. & Paxton
 Dendrobium alderwereltianum J.J.Sm.
 Dendrobium alexandrae Schltr.
 Dendrobium aliciae Ames & Quisumb.
 Dendrobium aloifolium (Blume) Rchb.f.
 Dendrobium alticola Schltr.
 Dendrobium amabile (Lour.) O'Brien
 Dendrobium amboinense Hook.
 Dendrobium amethystoglossum Rchb.f.
 Dendrobium amoenum Wall. ex Lindl.
 Dendrobium amphigenyum Ridl.
 Dendrobium amplum Lindl.
 Dendrobium anamalayanum Chandrab., V.Chandras. & N.C.Nair
 Dendrobium anceps Sw.
 Dendrobium ancipitum (P.O'Byrne & J.J.Verm.) Schuit. & Peter B.Adams
 Dendrobium × andersonianum F.M.Bailey
 Dendrobium andreemillarae T.M.Reeve
 Dendrobium angulatum Lindl.
 Dendrobium angusticaule P.J.Spence
 Dendrobium angustiflorum J.J.Sm.
 Dendrobium angustifolium (Blume) Lindl.
 Dendrobium angustipetalum J.J.Sm.
 Dendrobium angustispathum J.J.Sm.
 Dendrobium angustitepalum (W.K.Harris & M.A.Clem.) Schuit. & de Vogel
 Dendrobium angustum (D.L.Jones & M.A.Clem. J.M.H.Shaw
 Dendrobium anilii P.M.Salim., J.Mathew & Szlach.
 Dendrobium anisobulbon Schuit. & Peter B.Adams
 Dendrobium annae J.J.Sm.
 Dendrobium annamense Rolfe
 Dendrobium annuligerum Rchb.f.
 Dendrobium anosmum Lindl.
 Dendrobium antennatum Lindl. – green antelope orchid
 Dendrobium anthrene Ridl.
 Dendrobium apertum Schltr.
 Dendrobium aphanochilum Kraenzl.
 Dendrobium aphrodite Rchb.f.
 Dendrobium aphyllum (Roxb.) C.E.C.Fisch. – hooded orchid
 Dendrobium apiculiferum J.J.Sm.
 Dendrobium appendicula Schltr.
 Dendrobium appendiculatum (Blume) Lindl.
 Dendrobium aprinoides J.J.Sm.
 Dendrobium aprinum J.J.Sm.
 Dendrobium aqueum Lindl.
 Dendrobium arachnoideum Schltr.
 Dendrobium araneola Schltr.
 Dendrobium aratriferum J.J.Sm.
 Dendrobium archipelagense Howcroft & W.N.Takeuchi
 Dendrobium arcuatum J.J.Sm.
 Dendrobium arfakense J.J.Sm.
 Dendrobium argiense J.J.Sm.
 Dendrobium aridum J.J.Sm.
 Dendrobium aries J.J.Sm.
 Dendrobium aristiferum J.J.Sm.
 Dendrobium arjunoense (J.J.Wood & J.B.Comber) Schuit. & Peter B.Adams
 Dendrobium armeniacum P.J.Cribb
 Dendrobium armitiae F.M.Bailey
 Dendrobium aromaticum J.J.Sm.
 Dendrobium arthrobulbum Kraenzl.
 Dendrobium arunachalense C.Deori, S.K.Sarma, Phukan & A.A.Mao
 Dendrobium asperatum Schltr.
 Dendrobium asphale Rchb.f.
 Dendrobium assamicum S.Chowdhury
 Dendrobium atavus J.J.Sm.
 Dendrobium atjehense J.J.Sm.
 Dendrobium atroviolaceum Rolfe
 Dendrobium attenuatum Lindl.
 Dendrobium aurantiflammeum J.J.Wood
 Dendrobium aurantiiroseum P.Royen ex T.M.Reeve
 Dendrobium aureicolor J.J.Sm.
 Dendrobium aureilobum J.J.Sm.
 Dendrobium auriculatum Ames & Quisumb.
 Dendrobium austrocaledonicum Schltr.
 Dendrobium awormangae Ormerod
 Dendrobium axillare Schltr.
 Dendrobium ayubii J.B.Comber & J.J.Wood
 Dendrobium azureum Schuit.

B

 Dendrobium babiense J.J.Sm.
 Dendrobium baeuerlenii F.Muell. & Kraenzl.
 Dendrobium baileyi F.Muell. – blotched gemini orchid
 Dendrobium bakoense J.J.Wood
 Dendrobium balzerianum Fessel & Lückel
 Dendrobium bambusiforme Schltr.
 Dendrobium bambusinum Ridl.
 Dendrobium bancanum J.J.Sm.
 Dendrobium bandaense Schltr.
 Dendrobium banghamii Ames & C.Schweinf.
 Dendrobium baoernianum P.O'Byrne, P.T.Ong & J.J.Wood
 Dendrobium barbatulum Schltr. 
 Dendrobium barbatum Breda
 Dendrobium bariense J.J.Sm.
 Dendrobium barioense J.J.Wood
 Dendrobium basilanense Ames
 Dendrobium beamanianum J.J.Wood & A.L.Lamb
 Dendrobium begaudii (Cavestro) Schuit. & Peter B.Adams
 Dendrobium beleense Ormerod
 Dendrobium bellatulum Rolfe 
 Dendrobium bensoniae Rchb.f. – Benson's dendrobium
 Dendrobium bialatum J.J.Sm.
 Dendrobium bicameratum Lindl.
 Dendrobium bicarinatum Ames & C.Schweinf.
 Dendrobium bicaudatum Reinw. ex Lindl. 
 Dendrobium bicolense Lubag-Arquiza
 Dendrobium biconvexum (D.L.Jones & M.A.Clem.) J.M.H.Shaw – Mount Windsor rock orchid,
 Dendrobium bicostatum J.J.Sm.
 Dendrobium bicristatum Ormerod
 Dendrobium bidentiferum J.J.Sm.
 Dendrobium bifalce Lindl. – native bee orchid
 Dendrobium biflorum (G.Forst.) Sw.
 Dendrobium bifurcatum T.Yukawa
 Dendrobium bigibbum Lindl. 
 Dendrobium bigibbum var. bigibbum – mauve butterfly orchid
 Dendrobium bigibbum var. compactum (C.T.White) Peter B.Adams
 Dendrobium bigibbum var. schroederianum (Rchb.f. ex W.Watson) Peter B.Adams
 Dendrobium bigibbum var. superbum (Rchb.f. – Cooktown orchid
 Dendrobium bihamulatum J.J.Sm.
 Dendrobium bilobulatum Seidenf.
 Dendrobium bilobum Lindl.
 Dendrobium biloculare J.J.Sm.
 Dendrobium bismarckiense Schltr.
 Dendrobium blanche-amesiae A.D.Hawkes & A.H.Heller
 Dendrobium blaoense Schuit. & Peter B.Adams
 Dendrobium blumei Lindl.
 Dendrobium bobolei Ormerod
 Dendrobium boosii Coates & W.Suarez
 Dendrobium boridiense Ormerod
 Dendrobium bostrychodes Rchb.f.
 Dendrobium bowmanii Benth. – straggly pencil orchid
 Dendrobium brachyanthum Schltr.
 Dendrobium brachycalyptra Schltr.
 Dendrobium brachycentrum Ridl.
 Dendrobium brachypus (Endl.) Rchb.f. – Norfolk Island orchid
 Dendrobium brachythecum F.Muell. & Kraenzl.
 Dendrobium bracteosum Rchb.f.
 Dendrobium braianense Gagnep.
 Dendrobium branderhorstii J.J.Sm.
 Dendrobium brassii T.M.Reeve & P.Woods
 Dendrobium brevibulbum J.J.Sm.
 Dendrobium brevicaudum D.L.Jones & M.A.Clem. – Mount Finnigan pencil orchid,
 Dendrobium brevicaule Rolfe
 Dendrobium brevicaule subsp. brevicaule
 Dendrobium brevicaule subsp. calcarium (J.J.Sm.) T.M.Reeve & P.Woods
 Dendrobium brevicaule ssp. pentagonum (Kraenzl.) T.M.Reeve & P.Woods
 Dendrobium brevicolle J.J.Sm.
 Dendrobium brevilabium Schltr.
 Dendrobium brevimentum Seidenf.
 Dendrobium brillianum Ormerod & Cavestro
 Dendrobium brinkmanii Ormerod
 Dendrobium brunnescens Schltr.
 Dendrobium brunneum Schuit. & Peter B.Adams
 Dendrobium brymerianum Rchb.f.
 Dendrobium buffumii A.D.Hawkes
 Dendrobium bukidnonense Ames & Quisumb.
 Dendrobium bulbophylloides Schltr.
 Dendrobium bullenianum Rchb.f.
 Dendrobium bunuanense Ames
 Dendrobium burkeanum Ormerod
 Dendrobium busuangense Ames
 Dendrobium butchcamposii Cootes, M.Leon & R.Boos

C

 Dendrobium cabadharense Ames
 Dendrobium cacuminis Gagnep.
 Dendrobium cadetia J.J.Sm.
 Dendrobium cadetiiflorum J.J.Sm.
 Dendrobium cadetioides Schltr.
 Dendrobium caladenia Ormerod
 Dendrobium calcaratimentum P.O'Byrne
 Dendrobium calcaratum A.Rich.
 Dendrobium calcaratum subsp. calcaratum
 Dendrobium calcaratum subsp. papillatum Dauncey
 Dendrobium calcariferum Carr
 Dendrobium calceolum Roxb.
 Dendrobium calicopis Ridl.
 Dendrobium caliculi-mentum R.S.Rogers
 Dendrobium callitrophilum B.Gray & D.L.Jones – thin feather orchid
 Dendrobium calocephalum (Z.H.Tsi & S.C.Chem) Schuit. & Peter B.Adams
 Dendrobium calophyllum Rchb.f.
 Dendrobium calopogon Rchb.f.
 Dendrobium calothyrsos Schltr.
 Dendrobium calyptratum J.J.Sm.
 Dendrobium camaridiorum Rchb.f.
 Dendrobium campbellii P.J.Cribb & B.A.Lewis
 Dendrobium canaliculatum R.Br. 
 Dendrobium canaliculatum var. canaliculatum – brown tea tree orchid
 Dendrobium canaliculatum var. foelschei (F.Muell.) Rupp & T.E.Hunt – thin tea tree orchid
 Dendrobium cancroides T.E.Hunt – crab orchid
 Dendrobium candoonense Ames
 Dendrobium capillipes Rchb.f.
 Dendrobium capitellatoides J.J.Sm.
 Dendrobium capituliflorum Rolfe
 Dendrobium capra J.J.Sm.
 Dendrobium carinatum (L.) Willd.
 Dendrobium cariniferum Rchb.f.
 Dendrobium carinulatidiscum J.J.Sm.
 Dendrobium carmindae M.Leon
 Dendrobium carnicarinum Kores
 Dendrobium carolinense Schltr.
 Dendrobium carrii Rupp & C.T.White – furrowed moon orchid
 Dendrobium carronii Lavarack & P.J.Cribb – pink tea tree orchid
 Dendrobium caryicola Guillaumin.
 Dendrobium casuarinae Schltr.
 Dendrobium catillare Rchb.f.
 Dendrobium caudiculatum (M.A.Clem. & D.L.Jones) Schuit. & de Vogel
 Dendrobium cavipes J.J.Sm.
 Dendrobium celebense J.J.Sm.
 Dendrobium centrale J.J.Sm.
 Dendrobium centrosepalum Schuit., Juswara & Droissart
 Dendrobium ceraceum Schltr.
 Dendrobium ceratostyloides J.J.Sm.
 Dendrobium ceraula Rchb.f.
 Dendrobium cerinum Rchb.f.
 Dendrobium cervicaliferum J.J.Sm.
 Dendrobium chalmersii F.Muell.
 Dendrobium chamaephytum Schltr.
 Dendrobium chameleon Ames
 Dendrobium chapaense Aver.
 Dendrobium chewiorum J.J.Wood & A.L.Lamb
 Dendrobium chiangdaoense Promm., Kidyoo, Buddh. & Suddee
 Dendrobium chiengmaiense Schuit. & Peter B.Adams
 Dendrobium chionanthum Schltr.
 Dendrobium chittimae Seidenf.
 Dendrobium chloranthum Schuit. & Peter B.Adams
 Dendrobium chordiforme Kraenzl.
 Dendrobium christyanum Rchb.f.
 Dendrobium chrysanthum Wall. ex Lindl.
 Dendrobium chryseum Rolfe
 Dendrobium chrysobulbon Schltr.
 Dendrobium chrysocrepis C.S.P.Parish & Rchb.f. ex Hook.f.
 Dendrobium chrysographatum Ames
 Dendrobium chrysopterum Schuit. & de Vogel
 Dendrobium chrysosema Schltr.
 Dendrobium chrysotainium Schltr.
 Dendrobium chrysotoxum Lindl.
 Dendrobium chrysotropis Schltr.
 Dendrobium ciliatilabellum Seidenf.
 Dendrobium cinnabarinum Rchb.f.
 Dendrobium cinnabarinum var. angustitepalum Carr
 Dendrobium cinnabarinum var. cinnabarinum
 Dendrobium clausum Schltr.
 Dendrobium clavator Ridl.
 Dendrobium clavuligerum J.J.Sm.
 Dendrobium cleistanthum de Vogel, E.Winkel & Vugt
 Dendrobium cleistogamum Schltr.
 Dendrobium clemensiae Ames
 Dendrobium clementsii (D.L.Jones) J.M.H.Shaw – Cape York crimp orchid
 Dendrobium closterium Rchb.f.
 Dendrobium closterium var. closterium
 Dendrobium closterium var. jocosum (Rchb.f.) N.Hallé
 Dendrobium cobra Ormerod
 Dendrobium cochleatum J.J.Sm.
 Dendrobium cochliodes Schltr.
 Dendrobium codonosepalum J.J.Sm.
 Dendrobium coelandria Kraenzl.
 Dendrobium coeloglossum Schltr.
 Dendrobium collinsii (Lavarack) Schuit. & Peter B.Adams – McIlwraith burr orchid
 Dendrobium collinum J.J.Sm.
 Dendrobium coloratum J.J.Sm.
 Dendrobium comatum (Blume) Lindl.
 Dendrobium compactum Rolfe ex Hemsl.
 Dendrobium compressibulbum Schuit. & Peter B.Adams
 Dendrobium compressicaule J.J.Sm.
 Dendrobium compressimentum J.J.Sm.
 Dendrobium compressistylum J.J.Sm.
 Dendrobium compressum Lindl.
 Dendrobium conanthum Schltr.
 Dendrobium concavum J.J.Sm.
 Dendrobium concolor (Z.H.Tsa & S.C.Chen) Schuit. & Peter B.Adams
 Dendrobium confinale Kerr
 Dendrobium confluens J.J.Sm.
 Dendrobium confundens Kraenzl.
 Dendrobium conicum J.J.Sm.
 Dendrobium connatum (Blume) Lindl.
 Dendrobium connatum var. connatum
 Dendrobium connatum var. distachyon (Lindl.) P.O'Byrne
 Dendrobium connexicostatum J.J.Sm.
 Dendrobium conspicuum Bakh.f.
 Dendrobium constrictum J.J.Sm.
 Dendrobium contextum Schuit. & de Vogel ex J.M.H.Shaw
 Dendrobium convexipes J.J.Sm.
 Dendrobium convexum (Blume) Lindl. – piggyback orchid
 Dendrobium convolutum Rolfe
 Dendrobium copelandianum F.Muell. & Kraenzl.
 Dendrobium coplandii (F.M.Bailey) Rupp
 Dendrobium corallorhizon J.J.Sm.
 Dendrobium coriaceum (D.L.Jones & M.A.Clem.) J.M.H.Shaw – inland rock orchid
 Dendrobium correllianum A.D.Hawkes & A.H.Heller
 Dendrobium corrugatilobum J.J.Sm.
 Dendrobium corticicola Schltr.
 Dendrobium corydaliflorum J.J.Wood
 Dendrobium courtauldii Summerh. ex J.J.Wood
 Dendrobium cowenii P.O'Byrne & J.J.Verm.
 Dendrobium crabro Ridl.
 Dendrobium crassicaule Schltr.
 Dendrobium crassiflorum J.J.Sm.
 Dendrobium crassifolium Schltr.
 Dendrobium crassilabium P.J.Spence
 Dendrobium crassimarginatum L.O.Williams
 Dendrobium crassinervium J.J.Sm.
 Dendrobium crassulum (Schltr.) J.J.Sm.
 Dendrobium crassum (D.L.Jones, B.Gray & M.A.Clem.) J.M.H.Shaw – tablelands feather orchid
 Dendrobium crenatifolium J.J.Sm.
 Dendrobium crenatilabre J.J.Sm.
 Dendrobium crenatilobum (P.O'Byrne & J.J.Verm.) Schuit. & Peter B.Adams
 Dendrobium crenicristatum Ridl.
 Dendrobium crenulatum J.J.Sm.
 Dendrobium crepidatum Lindl. & Paxton
 Dendrobium crispatum (G.Forst.) Sw.
 Dendrobium crispilinguum P.J.Cribb
 Dendrobium crocatum Hook.f.
 Dendrobium croceocentrum J.J.Sm.
 Dendrobium crucilabre J.J.Sm.
 Dendrobium cruentum Rchb.f.
 Dendrobium crumenatum Sw. – pigeon orchid
 Dendrobium cruttwellii T.M.Reeve
 Dendrobium crystallinum Rchb.f.
 Dendrobium cuculliferum J.J.Sm.
 Dendrobium cucullitepalum J.J.Sm.
 Dendrobium cucumerinum MacLeay ex Lindl. – cucumber orchid
 Dendrobium cultrifolium Schltr.
 Dendrobium cumulatum Lindl.
 Dendrobium cuneatum Schltr.
 Dendrobium cuneilabium (Schltr.) J.J.Sm.
 Dendrobium cuneilabrum J.J.Sm.
 Dendrobium cunninghamii Lindl.
 Dendrobium curviflorum Rolfe
 Dendrobium curvimentum J.J.Sm.
 Dendrobium curvisepalum Ridl.
 Dendrobium curvum Ridl.
 Dendrobium cuspidatum Lindl.
 Dendrobium cuthbertsonii F.Muell.
 Dendrobium cyanocentrum Schltr.
 Dendrobium cyanopterum Kraenzl.
 Dendrobium cyatopoides J.J.Sm.
 Dendrobium cyclobulbon Schltr.
 Dendrobium cyclolobum Schltr.
 Dendrobium cyclopense J.J.Sm.
 Dendrobium cylindricum J.J.Sm.
 Dendrobium cymatoleguum Schltr.
 Dendrobium cymbicallum P.O'Byrne & J.J.Wood
 Dendrobium cymbidioides (Blume) Lindl.
 Dendrobium cymbiforme Rolfe
 Dendrobium cymboglossum J.J.Wood & A.L.Lamb
 Dendrobium cymbulipes J.J.Sm.
 Dendrobium cynthiae Schuit.
 Dendrobium cyrilianum P.O'Byrne, Gokusing & J.J.Wood
 Dendrobium cyrtolobum Schltr.
 Dendrobium cyrtosepalum Schltr.

D

 Dendrobium dactyliferum Rchb.f.
 Dendrobium dactylodes Rchb.f.
 Dendrobium daenikerianum Kraenzl.
 Dendrobium dahlemense Schltr.
 Dendrobium daimandaui J.J.Wood
 Dendrobium daklakense Tich., Schuit. & J.J.Verm.
 Dendrobium dalatense Gagnep.
 Dendrobium danipense Ormerod
 Dendrobium dantaniense Guillaumin
 Dendrobium darjeelingensis Pradhan
 Dendrobium davaoense Lubag-Arquiza
 Dendrobium dearei Rchb.f.
 Dendrobium debile Schltr.
 Dendrobium decoratum (M.A.Clem. & Cootes) Schuit. & Peter B.Adams
 Dendrobium decumbens Schltr.
 Dendrobium decumbens var. decumbens
 Dendrobium decumbens var. stenophyllum Schltr.
 Dendrobium deflexilobum J.J.Wood & A.L.Lamb
 Dendrobium dekockii J.J.Sm.
 Dendrobium delacourii Guillaumin
 Dendrobium deltatum Seidenf.
 Dendrobium dempoense J.J.Sm.
 Dendrobium dendrocolla J.J.Sm.
 Dendrobium dendrocolloides J.J.Sm.
 Dendrobium denigratum J.J.Sm.
 Dendrobium denneanum Kerr
 Dendrobium densiflorum Lindl. – mi hua shi hu
 Dendrobium densifolium Schltr. 
 Dendrobium dentatum Seidenf.
 Dendrobium denudans D.Don
 Dendrobium deplanchei Rchb.f.
 Dendrobium derekcabactulanii Cootes, Pimentel & M.Leon
 Dendrobium derryi Ridl.
 Dendrobium deuteroeburneum J.M.H.Shaw – rainforest feather orchid
 Dendrobium devogelii J.J.Wood
 Dendrobium devonianum Paxton
 Dendrobium devosianum J.J.Sm.
 Dendrobium dianiae P.O'Byrne & Wood
 Dendrobium diaphanum Schltr.
 Dendrobium diceras Schltr.
 Dendrobium dichaeoides Schltr.
 Dendrobium dichroma Schltr.
 Dendrobium dichrotropis Schltr.
 Dendrobium dickasonii L.O.Williams
 Dendrobium dielsianum Schltr.
 Dendrobium diffusum L.O.Williams
 Dendrobium dilatatocolle J.J.Sm.
 Dendrobium dillonianum A.D.Hawkes & A.H.Heller
 Dendrobium dimorphum J.J.Sm.
 Dendrobium diodon Rchb.f.
 Dendrobium diodon ssp. diodon
 Dendrobium diodon ssp. kodayarensis Gopalan & A.N.Henry
 Dendrobium dionaeoides J.J.Sm.
 Dendrobium discerptum J.J.Sm.
 Dendrobium discocaulon Schltr.
 Dendrobium discolor Lindl. – antler orchids
 Dendrobium discolor var. broomfieldii (Fitzg.) A.D.Hawkes – canary orchid
 Dendrobium discolor subsp. discolor – golden antler orchid
 Dendrobium discolor var. fimbrilabium (Rchb.f.) Dockrill
 Dendrobium discolor var. fuscum (Fitzg.) Dockrill – brown antler orchid
 Dendrobium discolor subsp. incurvata Liddle & P.I.Forst.
 Dendrobium disoides Schltr.
 Dendrobium dissitifolium Ridl.
 Dendrobium distichum (C.Presl.) Rchb.f.
 Dendrobium ditschiense J.J.Sm.
 Dendrobium dixanthum Rchb.f.
 Dendrobium dixonianum Rolfe ex Downie
 Dendrobium djamuense Schltr.
 Dendrobium dockrillii Ormerod
 Dendrobium dolichocaulon Schltr.
 Dendrobium doloissumbinii J.J.Wood
 Dendrobium doormanii J.J.Sm.
 Dendrobium doormantopense Ormerod
 Dendrobium draconis Rchb.f.
 Dendrobium dulce J.J.Sm.
 Dendrobium durum J.J.Sm.

E

 Dendrobium eboracense Kraenzl.
 Dendrobium echinocarpum (Schltr.) J.J.Sm.
 Dendrobium ecolle J.J.Sm.
 Dendrobium efogiense Ormerod
 Dendrobium elatum Schltr.
 Dendrobium elliottianum P.O'Byrne
 Dendrobium ellipsophyllum Tang & F.T.Wang
 Dendrobium elongaticolle Schltr.
 Dendrobium elongatum var elongatum
 Dendrobium elongatum var orientale J.J.Sm.
 Dendrobium emarginatum J.W.Moore
 Dendrobium endertii J.J.Sm.
 Dendrobium engae T.M.Reeve
 Dendrobium enigmatum Ormerod
 Dendrobium ephemerum (J.J.Sm.) J.J.Sm.
 Dendrobium epiphyticum (D.L.Jones & M.A.Clem.) J.M.H.Shaw – Illawarra rock orchid
 Dendrobium equitans Kraenzl.
 Dendrobium erectifolium J.J.Sm.
 Dendrobium erectilobum P.J.Spence
 Dendrobium erectopatens J.J.Sm.
 Dendrobium erectum Schltr.
 Dendrobium eriiflorum Griff.
 Dendrobium eriopexis Schltr.
 Dendrobium erostelle Seidenf.
 Dendrobium erosum (Blume) Lindl.
 Dendrobium erubescens Schltr.
 Dendrobium erythraeum Schuit. & de Vogel
 Dendrobium erythropogon Rchb.f.
 Dendrobium erythrosema (P.O'Byrne & J.J.Verm.) Schuit. & Peter B.Adams
 Dendrobium escritorii Ames
 Dendrobium eserre Seidenf.
 Dendrobium esuriens Rchb.f.
 Dendrobium eumelinum Schltr.
 Dendrobium eungellensis (D.L.Jones & M.A.Clem.) J.M.H.Shaw
 Dendrobium eurorum Ames
 Dendrobium euryanthum Schltr.
 Dendrobium exaltatum Schltr.
 Dendrobium exasperatum Schltr.
 Dendrobium exile Schltr.
 Dendrobium exilifolium Ames & C.Scheinf.
 Dendrobium eximium Schltr.
 Dendrobium extra-axillare Schltr.
 Dendrobium eymanum Ormerod

F

 Dendrobium faciferum J.J.Sm.
 Dendrobium fairchildiae Ames & Quisumb.
 Dendrobium falcatum J.J.Sm.
 Dendrobium falcipetalum Schltr.
 Dendrobium falconeri Hook.
 Dendrobium falcorostrum Fitzg. – beech orchid
 Dendrobium fallacinum Ormerod
 Dendrobium fanjingshanense Z.H.Tsi ex X.H.Jin & Y.W.Zhang
 Dendrobium fargesii Finet
 Dendrobium farinatum Schild. & Schraut
 Dendrobium fariniferum Schltr.
 Dendrobium farmeri Paxton 
 Dendrobium fellowsii F.Muell. – native damsel orchid
 Dendrobium ferdinandii Kraenzl.
 Dendrobium fililobum F.Muell.
 Dendrobium fimbriatum Hook.
 Dendrobium fimbrilabium J.J.Sm.
 Dendrobium findlayanum C.S.P.Parish & Rchb.f.
 Dendrobium finetianum Schltr.
 Dendrobium finisterrae Schltr.
 Dendrobium finniganense D.L.Jones – Mount Finnigan cane orchid
 Dendrobium fissum Schltr.
 Dendrobium flabelliforme Schltr.
 Dendrobium flabelloides J.J.Sm.
 Dendrobium flagellum Schltr.
 Dendrobium flavicolle Schltr.
 Dendrobium flabiliflorum Ormerod
 Dendrobium fleckeri Rupp & C.T.White – apricot cane orchid
 Dendrobium × fleischeri J.J.Sm.
 Dendrobium flexicaule Z.H.Tsi ex S.C.Sun & L.G.Xu
 Dendrobium flexile Ridl.
 Dendrobium floresianum Metusala & P.O'Byrne
 Dendrobium flos-wanua Metusala & P.O'Byrne
 Dendrobium fluctuosum J.J.Sm.
 Dendrobium × foederatum St.Cloud
 Dendrobium foetens Kraenzl.
 Dendrobium forbesii Ridl.
 Dendrobium forbesii var. forbesii
 Dendrobium forbesii var. praestans Schltr.
 Dendrobium formosum Roxb. ex Lindl.
 Dendrobium fornax Ormerod
 Dendrobium forrestii (Ormerod) Schuit. & Peter B.Adams
 Dendrobium foxii Ridl.
 Dendrobium fractiflexum Finet
 Dendrobium fractum T.M.Reeve
 Dendrobium franssenianum J.J.Sm.
 Dendrobium friedricksianum Rchb.f.
 Dendrobium fruticicola J.J.Sm.
 Dendrobium fruticosum Schuit. & de Vogel
 Dendrobium fugax Rchb.f.
 Dendrobium friedricksianum Rchb.f.
 Dendrobium fulgescens J.J.Sm.
 Dendrobium fulgidum Schltr.
 Dendrobium fulgidum subsp. fulgidum
 Dendrobium fulgidum subsp. maritimum (J.J.Sm.) Dauncey
 Dendrobium fuligineum J.J.Sm.
 Dendrobium fuliginosum (M.A.Clem. & D.L.Jones) P.F.Hunt
 Dendrobium fulminicaule J.J.Sm.
 Dendrobium funiforme Blume
 Dendrobium furcatopedicellatum Hayata
 Dendrobium furcatum Reinw. ex Lindl.
 Dendrobium furfuriferum J.J.Sm.
 Dendrobium fuscescens Griff.
 Dendrobium fusciflorum Ormerod
 Dendrobium fytchianum Bateman ex Rchb.f.

G

 Dendrobium gaoligongense (Hong Yu & S.G.Zhang) Schuit. & Peter B.Adams
 Dendrobium garrettii Seidenf.
 Dendrobium gatiense Schltr.
 Dendrobium gemellum Lindl.
 Dendrobium geminatum (Blume) Lindl.
 Dendrobium gemmiferum Kraenzl.
 Dendrobium georgei J.Matthew
 Dendrobium geotropum T.M.Reeve
 Dendrobium gerlandianum Kraenzl.
 Dendrobium gibbiferum J.J.Sm.
 Dendrobium gibbosum Gilli
 Dendrobium gibsonii Paxton
 Dendrobium giriwoense J.J.Sm.
 Dendrobium gjellerupii J.J.Sm.
 Dendrobium glabrum J.J.Sm. – creeping star orchid
 Dendrobium glaucoviride J.J.Sm.
 Dendrobium glebulosum Schltr.
 Dendrobium globiflorum Schltr.
 Dendrobium glomeratum H.J.Veitch ex Rob.
 Dendrobium glomeroides Ormerod
 Dendrobium glossorhynchoides Schltr.
 Dendrobium gnomus Ames
 Dendrobium gobiense Schltr.
 Dendrobium goilalae Ormerod
 Dendrobium goldfinchii  F.Muell.
 Dendrobium goldschmidtianum Kraenzl.
 Dendrobium goliathense J.J.Sm.
 Dendrobium goodallianum de Vogel, E.Winkel & Vugt
 Dendrobium gouldii Rchb.f.
 Dendrobium gracile (Blume) Lindl.
 Dendrobium gracilentum Schltr.
 Dendrobium gracilicaule F.Muell.
 Dendrobium gracilicaule var. gracilicaule – blotched cane orchid
 Dendrobium gracilicaule var. howeanum Maiden – yellow cane orchid
 Dendrobium gracilicolle Schltr.
 Dendrobium gracilifolium Schltr.
 Dendrobium gracilipes Burkill
 Dendrobium × gracillimum (Rupp) Leaney
 Dendrobium gramineum Ridl.
 Dendrobium grande Hook.f.
 Dendrobium grastidioides J.J.Sm.
 Dendrobium gratiosissimum Rchb.f.
 Dendrobium greenianum P.J.Cribb & B.A.Lewis
 Dendrobium gregulus Seidenf.
 Dendrobium griffithianum Lindl.
 Dendrobium × grimesii C.T.White & Summerh.
 Dendrobium grootingsii J.J.Sm.
 Dendrobium grossum Schltr.
 Dendrobium guamense Ames
 Dendrobium guerreroi Ames & Quisumb.
 Dendrobium guibertii Carrière
 Dendrobium gunnarii P.S.N.Rao
 Dendrobium guttenbergii J.J.Sm.
 Dendrobium guttulatum Schltr.
 Dendrobium gynoglottis Carr

H

 Dendrobium habbemense P.Royen
 Dendrobium hainanense Rolfe
 Dendrobium halmaheirense J.J.Sm.
 Dendrobium hamadryas Schltr.
 Dendrobium hamaticalcar J.J.Wood & Dauncey
 Dendrobium hamatum Rolfe
 Dendrobium hamiferum P.J.Cribb
 Dendrobium hampelii Cootes & Boos
 Dendrobium hancockii Rolfe
 Dendrobium hansmeyerense Ormerod
 Dendrobium hartleyi Ormerod
 Dendrobium harveyanum Rchb.f.
 Dendrobium hasseltii (Blume) Lindl.
 Dendrobium hastilabium Kraenzl.
 Dendrobium hawkesii A.H.Heller
 Dendrobium hekouense Z.J.Liu & L.J.Chen
 Dendrobium helix P.J.Cribb
 Dendrobium hellerianum A.D.Hawkes
 Dendrobium hellwigianum Kraenzl. ex Warb.
 Dendrobium hemimelanoglossum Guillamin
 Dendrobium hendersonii A.D.Hawkes & A.H.Heller
 Dendrobium henryi Schltr.
 Dendrobium hentyanum Ormerod
 Dendrobium heokhuii P.O'Byrne & J.J.Wood
 Dendrobium hepaticum J.J.Sm.
 Dendrobium herbaceum Lindl.
 Dendrobium hercoglossum Rchb.f.
 Dendrobium herpetophytum Schltr.
 Dendrobium hesperis (Seidenf.) Schuit. & Peter B.Adams
 Dendrobium heterobulbum Schltr.
 Dendrobium heterocarpum Wall. ex Lindl.
 Dendrobium heteroglossum Schltr.
 Dendrobium heteroideum Blume
 Dendrobium heyneanum Lindl.
 Dendrobium hippocrepiferum Schltr.
 Dendrobium hirsutifolium J.J.Wood
 Dendrobium hirtulum Rolfe
 Dendrobium hispidum A.Rich.
 Dendrobium histrionicum (Richb.f.) Schltr.
 Dendrobium hkinhumense Ormerod & C.S.Kumar
 Dendrobium hodgkinsonii Rolfe
 Dendrobium hoftii Ormerod
 Dendrobium hollandianum J.J.Sm.
 Dendrobium holochilum Schltr.
 Dendrobium homochromum J.J.Sm.
 Dendrobium homoglossum Schltr.
 Dendrobium hooglandianum Ormerod
 Dendrobium hookerianum Lindl.
 Dendrobium hooveri Ormerod
 Dendrobium hornei S.Moore
 Dendrobium horstii J.J.Sm.
 Dendrobium hosei Ridl.
 Dendrobium hughii Rchb.f.
 Dendrobium humboldtense J.J.Sm.
 Dendrobium humicolle Schltr.
 Dendrobium huttonii Rchb.f.
 Dendrobium hydrophilum J.J.Sm.
 Dendrobium hydrophilum var. hydrophilum
 Dendrobium hydrophilum var. morotaiense J.J.Sm.
 Dendrobium hymenanthum Rchb.f.
 Dendrobium hymenocentrum Schltr.
 Dendrobium hymenopetalum Schltr.
 Dendrobium hymenophyllum Lindl.
 Dendrobium hymenopterum Hook.f.
 Dendrobium hyperanthiflorum Kraenzl.
 Dendrobium hypopogon Kraenzl.

I

 Dendrobium ianthinum Schuit. & Puspit.
 Dendrobium iboense Schltr.
 Dendrobium igneoniveum J.J.Sm.
 Dendrobium igneum J.J.Sm.
 Dendrobium imbricatum J.J.Sm.
 Dendrobium imitans Schltr.
 Dendrobium imitator J.J.Wood
 Dendrobium implicatum Fukuy.
 Dendrobium inamoenum Kraenzl.
 Dendrobium inauditum Rchb.f.
 Dendrobium inconspicuum J.J.Sm.
 Dendrobium inconstans J.J.Sm.
 Dendrobium incumbens Schltr.
 Dendrobium incurvatum Schltr.
 Dendrobium incurvociliatum Schltr.
 Dendrobium incurvum Lindl.
 Dendrobium indivisum (Blume) Miq.
 Dendrobium indivisum var. fuscum P.O'Byrne
 Dendrobium indivisum var. indivisum
 Dendrobium indivisum var. lampangense Rolfe
 Dendrobium indivisum var. pallidum Seidenf.
 Dendrobium indragiriense Schltr.
 Dendrobium inflatum Rolfe
 Dendrobium informe J.J.Sm.
 Dendrobium infortunatum J.J.Sm.
 Dendrobium infractum J.J.Sm.
 Dendrobium infundibulum Lindl.
 Dendrobium ingratum J.J.Sm.
 Dendrobium insigne (Blume) Rchb.f. ex Miq. – tartan mangrove orchid
 Dendrobium insigne var. insigne
 Dendrobium insigne var. subsimplex J.J.Sm.
 Dendrobium integrilabium J.J.Sm.
 Dendrobium integrum Schltr.
 Dendrobium integrum subsp. integrum
 Dendrobium integrum subsp. merianum Ormerod
 Dendrobium interjectum Ames
 Dendrobium interruptum J.J.Sm.
 Dendrobium intricatum Gagnep.
 Dendrobium involutum Lindl.
 Dendrobium ionopus Rchb.f.
 Dendrobium irinae Ormerod
 Dendrobium isabelense Ormerod
 Dendrobium ischnopetalum Schltr.
 Dendrobium ischnophyton Schltr.
 Dendrobium isochiloides Kraenzl.
 Dendrobium isochiloides var. isochiloides
 Dendrobium isochiloides var. pumilum J.J.Sm.
 Dendrobium isthmiferum J.J.Sm.
 Dendrobium iteratum J.J.Sm.

J

 Dendrobium jabiense J.J.Sm.
 Dendrobium jacobsonii J.J.Sm.
 Dendrobium jadunae Schltr.
 Dendrobium jamirusii J.J.Wood & A.L.Lamb
 Dendrobium janowskyi J.J.Sm.
 Dendrobium jenkinsii Wall. ex Lindl.
 Dendrobium jennae P.O'Byrne
 Dendrobium jennyanum Kraenzl.
 Dendrobium jerdonianum Wight
 Dendrobium jiajiangense Z.Y.Zhu, S.J.Zhu & H.B.Wang
 Dendrobium jimcootesii Cabactulan & M.Leon
 Dendrobium johannis Rchb.f. – chocolate tea tree orchid
 Dendrobium johnsoniae F.Muell.
 Dendrobium jonesii Rendle – oak orchid
 Dendrobium jonesii var. jonesii
 Dendrobium jonesii var. magnificum (Dockrill) Dockrill – large oak orchid
 Dendrobium josephinae Cootes
 Dendrobium jubatum Schuit. & de Vogel
 Dendrobium judithiae P.O'Byrne
 Dendrobium junceum Lindl.
 Dendrobium juncifolium Schltr.
 Dendrobium juncoideum P.Royen
 Dendrobium junctilobum (Fessel & Lückel) Schuit. & Peter B.Adams
 Dendrobium juniperinum Schltr.

K
 

 Dendrobium kallarense J.Mathew, K.V.George, Yohannan & K.Madhus.
 Dendrobium kanakorum Kraenzl.
 Dendrobium kanburiense Seidenf.
 Dendrobium kanchianum Ormerod
 Dendrobium kaniense Schltr.
 Dendrobium karoense Schltr.
 Dendrobium katherinae A.D.Hawkes
 Dendrobium kauldorumii T.M.Reeve
 Dendrobium keithii Ridl.
 Dendrobium kelamense Metusala, P.O'Byrne & J.J.Wood
 Dendrobium kelsallii Ridl.
 Dendrobium kempfianum Ormerod
 Dendrobium kempterianum Schltr.
 Dendrobium kenepaiense J.J.Sm.
 Dendrobium kentrochilum Hook.f.
 Dendrobium kentrophyllum Hook.f.
 Dendrobium kerstingianum Schltr.
 Dendrobium ketrickkianum P.O'Byrne, Gokusing & A.L.Lamb
 Dendrobium keytsianum J.J.Sm.
 Dendrobium khanhoaense Aver.
 Dendrobium khasianum Deori
 Dendrobium kiauense Ames & C.Schweinf.
 Dendrobium kietaense Schltr.
 Dendrobium kinabuluense Ridl.
 Dendrobium kingianum Bidwill ex Lindl. – pink rock orchid
 Dendrobium kingianum ssp. carnarvonense Peter B.Adams
 Dendrobium kingianum ssp. kingianum
 Dendrobium kingianum var. pulcherrimum Rupp
 Dendrobium kirchianum A.D.Hawkes & A.H.Heller
 Dendrobium kjellbergii J.J.Sm.
 Dendrobium klabatense Schltr.
 Dendrobium klossii Ridl.
 Dendrobium kontumense Gagnep.
 Dendrobium koordersii J.J.Sm.
 Dendrobium korthalsii J.J.Sm.
 Dendrobium kotanicanum Ormerod
 Dendrobium koyamae Nob.Tanaka, T.Yukawa & J.Murata
 Dendrobium kraemeri Schltr.
 Dendrobium kraenzlinii L.O.Williams
 Dendrobium kratense Kerr
 Dendrobium kruiense J.J.Sm.
 Dendrobium kruizingae de Vogel, E.Winkel & Vugt
 Dendrobium kryptocheilum Gilli
 Dendrobium kurashigei T.Yukawa
 Dendrobium kuyperi J.J.Sm.

L

 Dendrobium labangense J.J.Sm.
 Dendrobium labuanum Lindl.
 Dendrobium laceratum Schltr.
 Dendrobium laciniosum Ridl.
 Dendrobium lacteum Kraenzl.
 Dendrobium laevifolium Stapf
 Dendrobium lagarum Seidenf.
 Dendrobium lageniforme J.J.Sm.
 Dendrobium lagirum P.Royen
 Dendrobium lambii J.J.Wood
 Dendrobium lamellatum (Blume) Lindl.
 Dendrobium lamelluliferum J.J.Sm.
 Dendrobium lamii J.J.Sm.
 Dendrobium lampongense J.J.Sm.
 Dendrobium lamprocaulon Schltr.
 Dendrobium lamproglossum Schltr.
 Dendrobium lamrianum C.L.Chan
 Dendrobium lamyaiae Seidenf.
 Dendrobium lanceolatum Gaudich.
 Dendrobium lancifolium A.Rich.
 Dendrobium lancilabium J.J.Sm.
 Dendrobium lancilobum J.J.Wood
 Dendrobium lancilobum var. lancilobum
 Dendrobium lancilobum var. roseocalcar (J.J.Wood & A.L.Lamb) J.J.Wood
 Dendrobium langbianense Gagnep.
 Dendrobium lankaviense Ridl.
 Dendrobium lanuginosum Ormerod
 Dendrobium lasianthera J.J.Sm.
 Dendrobium lasioglossum Rchb.f.
 Dendrobium latelabellatum Gilli
 Dendrobium laterale L.O.Williams
 Dendrobium latifrons J.J.Sm.
 Dendrobium latoureoides (Schltr.) J.J.Sm.
 Dendrobium laurensii J.J.Sm.
 Dendrobium laurifolium (Kraenzl.) J.J.Sm.
 Dendrobium lawesii F.Muell.
 Dendrobium lawiense J.J.Sm.
 Dendrobium laxiflorum J.J.Sm.
 Dendrobium ledifolium J.J.Sm.
 Dendrobium leeanum O'Brien
 Dendrobium legareiense J.J.Sm.
 Dendrobium leonis (Lindl.) Rchb.f.
 Dendrobium leontoglossum (Ridl.) Schltr.
 Dendrobium lepidochilum Kraenzl.
 Dendrobium leporinum J.J.Sm.
 Dendrobium leptocladum Hayata
 Dendrobium leptophyton Schuit. & de Vogel
 Dendrobium leucochlorum Rchb.f.
 Dendrobium leucocyanum T.M.Reeve
 Dendrobium leucohybos Schltr.
 Dendrobium levatii Kraenzl.
 Dendrobium lewisiae Schuit. & de Vogel
 Dendrobium leytense Ames
 Dendrobium lichenastrum (F.Muell.) Rolfe – common button orchid
 Dendrobium limii J.J.Wood
 Dendrobium limpidum Schuit. & de Vogel
 Dendrobium limpidum subsp. daunceyae Ormerod
 Dendrobium limpidum subsp. limpidum
 Dendrobium linawianum Rchb.f.
 Dendrobium lindleyi Steud.
 Dendrobium lineale Rolfe
 Dendrobium linearifolium Teijsm. & Binn.
 Dendrobium linguella Rchb.f.
 Dendrobium linguiforme Sw. – thumbnail orchid, tick orchid or tongue orchid
 Dendrobium linguiforme var. huntianum Rupp
 Dendrobium linguiforme var. linguiforme
 Dendrobium litorale Schltr. – coastal shaggy orchid
 Dendrobium lituiflorum Lindl.
 Dendrobium lobatum (Blume) Miq.
 Dendrobium lobbii Teijsm. & Binn. – straggly rush orchid
 Dendrobium lobulatum Rolfe ex J.J.Sm.
 Dendrobium loddigesii Rolfe
 Dendrobium loesenerianum Schltr.
 Dendrobium lohanense J.J.Wood
 Dendrobium loherianum Kraenzl.
 Dendrobium lohohense Tang & F.T.Wang
 Dendrobium lohokii J.J.Wood & A.L.Lamb
 Dendrobium lomatochilum Seidenf.
 Dendrobium lonchigerum Schltr.
 Dendrobium longicaule J.J.Sm.
 Dendrobium longicolle Lindl.
 Dendrobium longicornu Lindl.
 Dendrobium longipes Hook.f.
 Dendrobium longiramense J.J.Wood & P.O'Byrne
 Dendrobium longirepens Ames & C.Schweinf.
 Dendrobium longissimum Schltr.
 Dendrobium lowii Lindl.
 Dendrobium lucens Rchb.f.
 Dendrobium lueckelianum Fessel & M.Wolff
 Dendrobium lumakuense J.J.Wood
 Dendrobium lunatum Lindl.
 Dendrobium luoi L.J.Chen & W.H.Rao
 Dendrobium luteolum Bateman
 Dendrobium luxurians J.J.Sm.
 Dendrobium luzonense Lindl.
 Dendrobium lydiae Cootes, M.Leon & Naive

M

 Dendrobium maccarthiae Thwaites
 Dendrobium macfarlanei F.Muell.
 Dendrobium macraei Lindl.
 Dendrobium macranthum A.Rich.
 Dendrobium macraporum J.J.Sm.
 Dendrobium macrifolium J.J.Sm.
 Dendrobium macrogenion Schltr.
 Dendrobium macrolobum J.J.Sm.
 Dendrobium macrophyllum A.Rich.
 Dendrobium macrophyllum var. macrophyllum
 Dendrobium macrophyllum var. subvelutinum J.J.Sm.
 Dendrobium macrophyllum var. ternatense (J.J.Sm.) P.O'Byrne & J.J.Wood
 Dendrobium macropodum Hook.f.
 Dendrobium macropus (Endl.) Rchb.f. ex Lindl. – Norfolk Island cane orchid
 Dendrobium macrostachyum Lindl. – fringed tree orchid
 Dendrobium macrostigma J.J.Sm.
 Dendrobium maculosum J.J.Sm.
 Dendrobium magistratus P.J.Cribb
 Dendrobium magnilabre (P.J.Cribb & B.A.Lewis) Schuit. & Peter B.Adams
 Dendrobium maidenianum Schltr. – coastal burr orchid
 Dendrobium maierae J.J.Sm.
 Dendrobium malacanthum Kraenzl.
 Dendrobium malbrownii Dockrill – McIlwraith hermit orchid
 Dendrobium maleolens Kraenzl.
 Dendrobium maliliense J.J.Sm.
 Dendrobium maluense (Schltr.) J.J.Sm.
 Dendrobium malvicolor Ridl.
 Dendrobium mamberamense J.J.Sm.
 Dendrobium mannii Ridl.
 Dendrobium maraiparense J.J.Wood & C.L.Chan
 Dendrobium margaretiae T.M.Reeve
 Dendrobium mariae Schuit. & Peter B.Adams
 Dendrobium marmoratum Rchb.f.
 Dendrobium masarangense Schltr.
 Dendrobium masarangense var. chlorinum (Ridl.) T.M.Reeve & P.Woods
 Dendrobium masarangense subsp. masarangense 
 Dendrobium masarangense subsp. theionanthum (Schltr.) T.M.Reeve & P.Woods
 Dendrobium masonii Rupp
 Dendrobium mastersianum F.Muell. & Kraenzl.
 Dendrobium matapense Oremerod
 Dendrobium mayandyi T.M.Reeve & Renz
 Dendrobium megaceras Hook.f.
 Dendrobium megalanthum Schltr.
 Dendrobium meiernianum P.O'Byrne, P.T.Ong & J.J.Wood
 Dendrobium mekynosepalum Schltr.
 Dendrobium melanostictum Schltr.
 Dendrobium melanotrichum Schltr.
 Dendrobium melinanthum Schltr.
 Dendrobium meliodorum Schltr.
 Dendrobium mellicolor J.J.Sm.
 Dendrobium merrillii Ames
 Dendrobium metachilinum Rchb.f.
 Dendrobium metrium Kraenzl.
 Dendrobium micholitzii Rolfe ex Ames
 Dendrobium microbulbon A.Rich.
 Dendrobium microglaphys Rchb.f.
 Dendrobium micronephelium J.J.Sm.
 Dendrobium microphoton L.O.Williams
 Dendrobium milaniae Fessel & Lückel
 Dendrobium militare P.J.Cribb
 Dendrobium millarae A.D.Hawkes
 Dendrobium mimicum (Ormerod) Schuit. & Peter B.Adams
 Dendrobium mindanaense Ames
 Dendrobium minimiflorum Gilli
 Dendrobium minimum Ames & C.Schweinf.
 Dendrobium minjemense Schltr.
 Dendrobium minisculum Aver.
 Dendrobium mirandum Schltr.
 Dendrobium mirbelianum Gaudich. – dark-stemmed antler orchid, mangrove orchid
 Dendrobium mischobulbum Schltr.
 Dendrobium miserum Rchb.f.
 Dendrobium misoanum Oremerod
 Dendrobium miyasakii Ames & Quisumb.
 Dendrobium modestum Rchb.f.
 Dendrobium mohlianum Rchb.f.
 Dendrobium mohlianum subsp. kolombangaricum Ormerod
 Dendrobium mohlianum subsp. mohlianum
 Dendrobium molle J.J.Sm.
 Dendrobium moniliforme (L.) Sw.
 Dendrobium monophyllum F.Muell. – lily-of-the-valley orchid
 Dendrobium montanum J.J.Sm.
 Dendrobium montedeakinense F.M.Bailey
 Dendrobium monticola P.F.Hunt & Summerh.
 Dendrobium montis-hosei J.J.Wood
 Dendrobium montis-sellae Kraenzl.
 Dendrobium montis-yulei Kraenzl.
 Dendrobium mooreanum Lindl.
 Dendrobium moorei F.Muell. – drooping cane orchid
 Dendrobium moquetteanum J.J.Sm.
 Dendrobium morotaiense J.J.Sm.
 Dendrobium morrisonii Schltr.
 Dendrobium mortii F.Muell. – slender pencil orchid
 Dendrobium moschatum (Banks) Sw.
 Dendrobium mucronatum Seidenf.
 Dendrobium mucrovaginatum Metusala & J.J.Wood
 Dendrobium mulderi Schuit. & de Vogel
 Dendrobium multifolium Schltr.
 Dendrobium multilineatum Kerr
 Dendrobium multiramosum Ames
 Dendrobium multistriatum J.J.Sm.
 Dendrobium muluense J.J.Wood
 Dendrobium munificum (Finet) Schltr.
 Dendrobium muricatum Finet
 Dendrobium muriciferum (J.J.Sm.) Oremerod
 Dendrobium mussauense Oremerod
 Dendrobium mutabile (Blume) Lindl.
 Dendrobium mystroglossum Schltr.

N

 Dendrobium nabawanense J.J.Wood & A.L.Lamb
 Dendrobium nakaharae Schltr.
 Dendrobium nanarauticola Fukuy.
 Dendrobium nanocompactum Seidenf.
 Dendrobium nanum Hook.f.
 Dendrobium nardoides Schltr.
 Dendrobium nareshbahadurii H.B.Naithani
 Dendrobium nathanielis Rchb.f.
 Dendrobium nativitatis Ridl. – Christmas Island crimp orchid
 Dendrobium navicula Kraenzl.
 Dendrobium nazaretii (P.O'Byrne & J.J.Verm.) Schuit. & Peter B.Adams
 Dendrobium nebularum Schltr.
 Dendrobium neglectum Gagnep.
 Dendrobium nemorale L.O.Williams
 Dendrobium neoguineense A.D.Hawkes & A.H.Heller
 Dendrobium neospectabile J.M.H.Shaw – Eungella king orchid
 Dendrobium nephrolepidis Schltr.
 Dendrobium neuroglossun Schltr.
 Dendrobium ngoyense Schltr.
 Dendrobium nieuwenhuisii J.J.Sm.
 Dendrobium nigricans Schltr.
 Dendrobium nimium J.J.Sm.
 Dendrobium nindii W.Hill – blue antler orchid
 Dendrobium nitidicolle W.Hill
 Dendrobium nitidiflorum J.J.Sm.
 Dendrobium nitidissimum Rchb.f.
 Dendrobium niveobarbatum Cootes
 Dendrobium niveopurpureum J.J.Sm.
 Dendrobium njongense Schltr.
 Dendrobium nobile Lindl.
 Dendrobium nodosum Dalzell
 Dendrobium noesae J.J.Sm.
 Dendrobium normanbyense P.J.spence
 Dendrobium nothofageti (M.A.Clem & D.L.Jones) Schuit. & de Vogel
 Dendrobium nothofagicola T.M.Reeve
 Dendrobium nubigenum Schltr.
 Dendrobium nudum (Blume) Lindl.
 Dendrobium numaldeorii C.Deori, Hynn. & Phukan
 Dendrobium nummularia Schltr.
 Dendrobium nycteridoglossum Rchb.f.

O

 Dendrobium obcordatum J.J.Sm.
 Dendrobium obliquum Schltr.
 Dendrobium oblongimentum Hosok. & Fukuy.
 Dendrobium obovatum Schltr.
 Dendrobium obreniforme Schuit. & Peter B.Adams
 Dendrobium obrienianum Kraenzl.
 Dendrobium obscureauriculatum Gilli
 Dendrobium obtusum Schltr.
 Dendrobium obyrnei (W.K.Harris) Schuit. & de Vogel
 Dendrobium ochraceum De Wild.
 Dendrobium ochranthum Schltr.
 Dendrobium ochreatum Lindl.
 Dendrobium ochroleucum Teijsm. & Binn.
 Dendrobium ochthochilum P.O'Byrne & J.J.Verm.
 Dendrobium odoardii Kraenzl.
 Dendrobium odontopus Schltr.
 Dendrobium odoratum Schltr.
 Dendrobium officinale Kimura & Migo
 Dendrobium okabeanum Tuyama
 Dendrobium okinawense Hatus. & Ida
 Dendrobium oliganthum Schltr.
 Dendrobium oligophyllum Gagnep.
 Dendrobium olivaceum J.J.Sm.
 Dendrobium omissum Schuit. & Peter B.Adams
 Dendrobium opaciforme J.J.Sm.
 Dendrobium opilionites Schltr.
 Dendrobium oppositifolium (Kraenzl.) N.Hallé
 Dendrobium optimuspatruus P.O'Byrne & J.J.Verm.
 Dendrobium orbilobulatum Fessel & Lückel
 Dendrobium ordinatum J.J.Sm.
 Dendrobium oreodoxa Schltr.
 Dendrobium orientale J.J.Sm.
 Dendrobium ornithoflorum Ames
 Dendrobium osmophytopsis Kraenzl.
 Dendrobium ostrinum J.J.Sm.
 Dendrobium ostrinum var. ochroleucum J.J.Sm.
 Dendrobium ostrinum var. ostrinum
 Dendrobium otaguroanum A.D.Hawkes
 Dendrobium ou-hinnae Schltr.
 Dendrobium ovatifolium Ridl.
 Dendrobium ovatipetalum J.J.Sm.
 Dendrobium ovatum (L.) Kraenzl.
 Dendrobium ovipostoriferum J.J.Sm.
 Dendrobium oxychilum Schltr.

P

 Dendrobium paathii J.J.Sm.
 Dendrobium pachyanthum Schltr.
 Dendrobium pachyglossum C.S.P.Parish & Rchb.f.
 Dendrobium pachyphyllum (Kuntze) Bakh.f.
 Dendrobium pachystele Schltr.
 Dendrobium pachythrix T.M.Reeve & P.Woods
 Dendrobium pacificum M.A.Clem. & P.J.Spence
 Dendrobium padangense Schltr.
 Dendrobium × pahangense Carr
 Dendrobium paitanense J.J.Wood
 Dendrobium palawense Schltr.
 Dendrobium pallidum (Chadim) M.A.Clem. & P.J.Spence
 Dendrobium palpebrae Lindl.
 Dendrobium pandaneti Ridl.
 Dendrobium panduratum Lindl.
 Dendrobium panduratum ssp. panduratum
 Dendrobium panduratum ssp. villosum Gopalan & A.N.Henry
 Dendrobium panduriferum Hook.f.
 Dendrobium pangunaense (Ormerod) Schuit. & Peter B.Adams
 Dendrobium pantherinum Schltr.
 Dendrobium papilio Loher
 Dendrobium papillilabium J.J.Sm.
 Dendrobium papuanum J.J.Sm.
 Dendrobium papyraceum J.J.Sm.
 Dendrobium paradoxum Teijsm. & Binn.
 Dendrobium paragnomus Ormerod
 Dendrobium parciflorum Rchb.f. ex Lindl.
 Dendrobium parcum Rchb.f.
 Dendrobium pardalinum Rchb.f.
 Dendrobium parietiforme J.J.Sm.
 Dendrobium parishii H.Low
 Dendrobium parnatanum Cavestro
 Dendrobium parthenium Rchb.f.
 Dendrobium particolor Ormerod
 Dendrobium parvifolium J.J.Sm.
 Dendrobium parvilobum Schltr.
 Dendrobium parvilobum Rolfe
 Dendrobium paspalifolium J.J.Sm.
 Dendrobium patentifiliforme Hosok.
 Dendrobium patentilobum Ames & Schweinf.
 Dendrobium patentissimum J.J.Sm.
 Dendrobium patulum Schltr.
 Dendrobium paucilaciniatum J.J.Sm.
 Dendrobium pectinatum Finet
 Dendrobium peculiare J.J.Sm.
 Dendrobium pedicellatum J.J.Sm.
 Dendrobium pedilochilum Schltr.
 Dendrobium peguanum Lindl.
 Dendrobium pemae Schltr.
 Dendrobium pendulum Roxb.
 Dendrobium pensile Ridl.
 Dendrobium pentanema Schltr.
 Dendrobium pentapterum Schltr.
 Dendrobium percnanthum Rchb.f.
 Dendrobium pergracile Ames
 Dendrobium perlongum Schltr.
 Dendrobium perpaulum Seidenf.
 Dendrobium perulatum Gagnep.
 Dendrobium petiolatum Schltr.
 Dendrobium petrophilum (Kraenzl.) Garay ex N.Hallé
 Dendrobium phaeanthum Schltr.
 Dendrobium phaeanthum Schltr.
 Dendrobium phalangillum J.J.Sm.
 Dendrobium phalangium Schltr.
 Dendrobium philippinense Ames
 Dendrobium phillipsii Ames & Quisumb.
 Dendrobium phragmitoides Schltr.
 Dendrobium phuketense Schuit. & Peter B.Adams
 Dendrobium pictum Lindl.
 Dendrobium piestocaulon Schltr.
 Dendrobium piestocaulon var. kauloense Schltr.
 Dendrobium piestocaulon var. piestocaulon
 Dendrobium pililobum J.J.Sm.
 Dendrobium pinifoliumLeslie Andrew Garay
 Dendrobium piranha C.L.Chan & P.J.Cribb
 Dendrobium planibulbe Lindl.
 Dendrobium planicaule Ridl.
 Dendrobium planum J.J.Sm.
 Dendrobium platybasis J.J.Sm.
 Dendrobium platycaulon Rolfe
 Dendrobium platyclinoides J.J.Sm.
 Dendrobium platygastrium Rchb.f.
 Dendrobium platylobum (Schltr.) J.J.Sm.
 Dendrobium platyphyllum Schltr.
 Dendrobium pleasancium P.O'Byrne & J.J.Verm
 Dendrobium plebeim J.J.Sm.
 Dendrobium pleianthum Schltr.
 Dendrobium pleiostachyum Rchb.f.
 Dendrobium pleurodes Schltr.
 Dendrobium plicatile Lindl.
 Dendrobium plumilobum J.J.Sm.
 Dendrobium podocarpifolium Schltr.
 Dendrobium podochiloides Schltr.
 Dendrobium pogonatherum J.J.Sm.
 Dendrobium pogoniates Rchb.f.
 Dendrobium pohnpeiense Schuit. & Peter B.Adams
 Dendrobium poissonianum Schltr.
 Dendrobium polyanthum Wall. ex Lindl.
 Dendrobium polycladium Rchb.f.
 Dendrobium polycladium var. atractoglossum N.Hallé
 Dendrobium polycladium var. polycladium
 Dendrobium polyphyllum Schltr.
 Dendrobium polyrhopalon Ormerod
 Dendrobium polyschistum Schltr.
 Dendrobium polyschistum var. graminiforme Schltr.
 Dendrobium polyschistum var. polyschistum
 Dendrobium polytrichum Ames
 Dendrobium ponapense Schltr.
 Dendrobium poneroides Schltr.
 Dendrobium poneroides var. angustum Schltr.
 Dendrobium poneroides var. poneroides
 Dendrobium porphyrochilum Lindl.
 Dendrobium potamophila Schltr.
 Dendrobium praecinctum Rchb.f.
 Dendrobium praemorsum Schuit. & de Vogel
 Dendrobium praetermissum Seidenf.
 Dendrobium prasinum Lindl.
 Dendrobium prianganense J.J.Wood & J.B.Comber
 Dendrobium × primulardii Horridge
 Dendrobium procerum Schltr.
 Dendrobium procumbens Carr
 Dendrobium profusum Rchb.f.
 Dendrobium prostheciglossum Schltr.
 Dendrobium prostratum Ridl.
 Dendrobium proteranthum Seidenf.
 Dendrobium protractum Dauncey
 Dendrobium pruinosum Teijsm. & Binn. – honey orchid
 Dendrobium pseudoaloifolium J.J.Wood
 Dendrobium pseudoaprinum J.J.Sm.
 Dendrobium pseudocalceolum J.J.Sm.
 Dendrobium pseudoclavator J.J.Wood
 Dendrobium pseudoconanthum J.J.Sm.
 Dendrobium pseudoconvexum Ames
 Dendrobium pseudoconvexum Fessel & Lückel
 Dendrobium pseudoglomeratum T.M.Reeve & J.J.Wood
 Dendrobium pseudointricatum Guillaumin
 Dendrobium pseudokurashigei J.J.Wood
 Dendrobium pseudolamellatum J.J.Wood & A.L.Lamb
 Dendrobium pseudopeloricum J.J.Sm.
 Dendrobium pseudorarum Dauncey
 Dendrobium pseudorarum var. baciforme Dauncey
 Dendrobium pseudostriatellum J.J.Wood & P.O'Byrne
 Dendrobium pseudotenellum Guillaumin
 Dendrobium pterocarpum Ames
 Dendrobium puberulilingue J.J.Sm.
 Dendrobium pugioniforme A.Cunn. ex Lindl. – dagger orchid
 Dendrobium pulchellum Roxb. ex Lindl.
 Dendrobium pulchrum Schltr.
 Dendrobium pulleanum J.J.Sm.
 Dendrobium pullenianum Ormerod
 Dendrobium pulvilliferum Schltr.
 Dendrobium pulvinatum Schltr.
 Dendrobium punamense Schltr.
 Dendrobium punbatuense J.J.Wood
 Dendrobium puncticulosum J.J.Sm.
 Dendrobium puniceum Ridl.
 Dendrobium purpureiflorum J.J.Sm.
 Dendrobium purpureoflavescens Ormerod
 Dendrobium purpureostelidium Ames
 Dendrobium purpureum Roxb.
 Dendrobium purpureum subsp. candidulum (Rchb.f.) Dauncey and P.J.Cribb
 Dendrobium purpureum ssp. purpureum
 Dendrobium putnamii A.D.Hawkes & A.H.Heller
 Dendrobium pycnostachyum Lindl.

Q

 Dendrobium quadriferum Schltr.
 Dendrobium quadrilobatum Carr
 Dendrobium quadrilobum Rolfe
 Dendrobium quadriquetrum J.J.Sm.
 Dendrobium quinqhecallosum J.J.Sm.
 Dendrobium quinquecaudatum J.J.Sm.
 Dendrobium quinquedentatum J.J.Sm.
 Dendrobium quinquelobatum Schltr.
 Dendrobium quinquelobum (Schltr.) J.J.Sm.
 Dendrobium quisumbingii A.D.Hawkes & A.H.Heller

R

 Dendrobium racemosum (Nicholls) Clemesha & Dockrill – erect pencil orchid
 Dendrobium rachmatii J.J.Sm.
 Dendrobium racieanum Cavestro
 Dendrobium radians Rchb.f.
 Dendrobium radiatum (D.L.Jones & M.A.Clem.) J.M.H.Shaw – brushbox feather orchid
 Dendrobium radicosum Ridl.
 Dendrobium ramificans J.J.Sm.
 Dendrobium ramosii Ames
 Dendrobium rantii J.J.Sm.
 Dendrobium rappardii J.J.Sm.
 Dendrobium rariflorum J.J.Sm.
 Dendrobium rarum Schltr.
 Dendrobium rarum var. miscegeneum Dauncey
 Dendrobium rarum var. pelorium Dauncey
 Dendrobium ravanii Cootes
 Dendrobium rechingerorum Schltr.
 Dendrobium reconditum Schuit. & Peter B.Adams – closed burr orchid
 Dendrobium recurvatum (Blume) J.J.Sm.
 Dendrobium recurvifolium J.J.Sm.
 Dendrobium recurvilabre J.J.Sm.
 Dendrobium reflexitepalum J.J.Sm.
 Dendrobium reflexum Schuit. & de Vogel
 Dendrobium refractum Teijsm. & Binn.
 Dendrobium regale Schltr.
 Dendrobium regale var. euanthum Schltr.
 Dendrobium regale var. regale
 Dendrobium reginanivis P.O'Byrne & J.J.Verm
 Dendrobium regium Prain
 Dendrobium reineckei Schltr.
 Dendrobium remotisepalum J.J.Sm.
 Dendrobium reniforme J.J.Sm.
 Dendrobium rennellii P.J.Cribb
 Dendrobium repandum Schuit. & de Vogel
 Dendrobium restrepioides (W.Suarez & M.A.Clem.) J.M.H.Shaw
 Dendrobium revolutum Lindl.
 Dendrobium reypimentelli Cootes
 Dendrobium rhabdoglossum Schltr.
 Dendrobium rhipidolobum Schltr.
 Dendrobium rhodobalion Schltr.
 Dendrobium rhodocentrum Rchb.f.
 Dendrobium rhodochilum (Ferreras & Cootes) Schuit. & Peter B.Adams
 Dendrobium rhodostele Ridl.
 Dendrobium rhodostictum F.Muell. & Kraenzl.
 Dendrobium rhombeum Lindl.
 Dendrobium rhombopetalum Kraenzl.
 Dendrobium rhytidothece Schltr.
 Dendrobium rickscottianum P.O'Byrne & J.J.Verm
 Dendrobium ridleyanum Schltr.
 Dendrobium rigidifolium Rolfe
 Dendrobium rigidum R.Br. – smooth tongue orchid, smooth tick orchid
 Dendrobium rindjaniense J.J.Sm.
 Dendrobium riparium J.J.Sm.
 Dendrobium ritaeanum King & Pantl.
 Dendrobium roseatum Ridl.
 Dendrobium roseicolor A.D.Hawkes & A.H.Heller
 Dendrobium roseiodorum Sathap., T.Yukawa & Seelanan
 Dendrobium roseipes Schltr.
 Dendrobium rosellum Ridl.
 Dendrobium roseoflavidum Schltr.
 Dendrobium roseonervatum Schltr.
 Dendrobium roseosparsum P.O'Byrne & J.J.Verm
 Dendrobium roseostriatum Ridl.
 Dendrobium rotundatum (Lindl.) Hook.f.
 Dendrobium rubropictum Schltr.
 Dendrobium ruckeri Lindl.
 Dendrobium ruginosum Ames
 Dendrobium rugosum (Blume) Lindl.
 Dendrobium rugulosum J.J.Sm.
 Dendrobium rumphiae Rchb.f.
 Dendrobium rupestre J.J.Sm.
 Dendrobium rupicola Ridl.
 Dendrobium rupicoloides J.M.H.Shaw – northern rock orchid
 Dendrobium × ruppiosum Clemesha
 Dendrobium rutriferum Rchb.f.
 Dendrobium ruttenii J.J.Sm.

S

 Dendrobium sabahense J.J.Wood
 Dendrobium sacculiferum J.J.Sm.
 Dendrobium sagittatum J.J.Sm.
 Dendrobium salaccense (Blume) Lindl.
 Dendrobium salicifolium J.J.Sm.
 Dendrobium salomonense Schltr.
 Dendrobium sambasanum J.J.Sm.
 Dendrobium samoense P.J.Cribb
 Dendrobium sancristobalense P.J.Cribb
 Dendrobium sanderae Rolfe
 Dendrobium sandsii J.J.Wood & C.L.Chan
 Dendrobium sanguinolentum Lindl.
 Dendrobium sanseiense Hayata
 Dendrobium sarawakense Merr.
 Dendrobium sarcochilus Finet
 Dendrobium sarcochilus var. megalorhizum (Kraenzl.) Hallé
 Dendrobium sarcochilus var. sarcochilus
 Dendrobium sarcodes Schltr.
 Dendrobium sarcodes var. majus Schltr.
 Dendrobium sarcodes var. sarcodes
 Dendrobium sarcophyllum Schltr.
 Dendrobium sarmentosum Rolfe
 Dendrobium savannicola Schltr.
 Dendrobium sayeri Schltr.
 Dendrobium scabrifolium Ridl.
 Dendrobium scabrilingue Lindl.
 Dendrobium schettleri Cootes
 Dendrobium schinzii Rolfe
 Dendrobium schistoglossum Schltr.
 Dendrobium schneiderae F.M.Bailey – moon orchid
 Dendrobium schneiderae var. major Rupp
 Dendrobium schneiderae var. schneiderae
 Dendrobium schoeninum Lindl. – common pencil orchid
 Dendrobium schouteniense J.J.Sm.
 Dendrobium schuetzei Rolfe
 Dendrobium schulleri J.J.Sm.
 Dendrobium schwartzkopfianum Kraenzl.
 Dendrobium schweinfurthianum A.D.Hawkes & A.H.Heller
 Dendrobium scirpoides Schltr.
 Dendrobium scopa Lindl.
 Dendrobium scopula Schltr.
 Dendrobium scoriarum W.W.Sm.
 Dendrobium scorpionis Ormerod
 Dendrobium scotiiforme J.J.Sm.
 Dendrobium sculptum Rchb.f..
 Dendrobium secundum (Blume) Lindl.
 Dendrobium sematoglossum Schltr.
 Dendrobium senile C.S.P.Parish & Rchb.f.
 Dendrobium sepikanum Schltr.
 Dendrobium septemcostulatum J.J.Sm.
 Dendrobium seranicum J.J.Sm.
 Dendrobium serena-alexianum J.J.Wood & A.L.Lamb
 Dendrobium serratilabium L.O.Williams
 Dendrobium serratipetalum Schltr.
 Dendrobium sessanicum Apang
 Dendrobium setifolium Ridl.
 Dendrobium setosum Schltr.
 Dendrobium shearmanii Schuit. & de Vogel
 Dendrobium shiraishii T.Yukawa & M.Nishida
 Dendrobium shiraishii Z.L.Chen, S.J.Zeng & Duan
 Dendrobium shompenii B.K.Sinha & P.S.N.Rao
 Dendrobium shamrii Ormerod
 Dendrobium siberutense J.J.Sm.
 Dendrobium sibilense Ormerod
 Dendrobium sibuyanense Lubag-Arquiza
 Dendrobium sidikalangense Dauncey
 Dendrobium siewhongii (P.O'Byrne) J.M.H.Shaw
 Dendrobium signatum Rchb.f.
 Dendrobium similissimum Ormerod
 Dendrobium simondii Gagnep.
 Dendrobium simplex J.J.Sm.
 Dendrobium simplicicaule J.J.Sm.
 Dendrobium singaporense A.D.Hawkes & A.H.Heller
 Dendrobium singkawangense J.J.Sm.
 Dendrobium singulare Ames & C.Schweinf.
 Dendrobium sinianum P.O'Byrne
 Dendrobium sinominutiflorum S.C.Chen, J.J.Wood & H.P.Wood
 Dendrobium sinsuronense J.J.Wood
 Dendrobium sinuosum Ames
 Dendrobium sirophyton Schuit. & de Vogel
 Dendrobium sitanalae J.J.Sm.
 Dendrobium sladei J.J.Wood & P.J.Cribb
 Dendrobium sleumeri Ormerod
 Dendrobium smillieae F.Muell. – bottlebrush orchid
 Dendrobium smithianum Schltr.
 Dendrobium solomonense (Carr) Schuit. & Peter B.Adams
 Dendrobium somae Hayata
 Dendrobium soriense Howcroft
 Dendrobium sororium Schltr.
 Dendrobium spatella Rchb.f.
 Dendrobium spathilabium Ames & C.Schweinf.
 Dendrobium spathilingue J.J.Sm.
 Dendrobium spathipetalum J.J.Sm.
 Dendrobium spathulatum L.O.Williams
 Dendrobium × speciokingianum T.Lawr.
 Dendrobium speciosum Sm. – rock orchids
 Dendrobium speciosum var. blackdownense Peter B.Adams
 Dendrobium speciosum var. boreale Peter B.Adams, Jac.M.Burke & S.D.Lawson
 Dendrobium speciosum var. capricornicum Clemesha – Capricorn rock orchid
 Dendrobium speciosum var. carnarvonense Peter B.Adams – gorge pink rock orchid
 Dendrobium speciosum var. curvicaule F.M.Bailey – rainforest rock orchid
 Dendrobium speciosum var. grandiflorum F.M.Bailey – golden king orchid
 Dendrobium speciosum var. hillii Mast. – pale king orchid
 Dendrobium speciosum var. pedunculatum Clemesha – dwarf rock orchid
 Dendrobium speciosum var. speciosum – Sydney rock orchid, rock lily
 Dendrobium speckmaieri Fessel & Lückel
 Dendrobium spectabile (Blume) Miq.
 Dendrobium spectatissimum Rchb.f.
 Dendrobium speculum J.J.Sm.
 Dendrobium spenceanum Ormerod
 Dendrobium sphenochilum F.Muell. & Kraenzl.
 Dendrobium spinuliferum Ormerod
 Dendrobium spurium (Blume) J.J.Sm.
 Dendrobium steatoglossum Rchb.f.
 Dendrobium steinii J.J.Sm.
 Dendrobium stelidiiferum J.J.Sm.
 Dendrobium stella-silvae (Loher & Kraenzl.) Ames
 Dendrobium stellare Dauncey
 Dendrobium stelliferum J.J.Sm.
 Dendrobium stenocentrum Schltr.
 Dendrobium stenoglossum Gagnep.
 Dendrobium stenophyllum Schltr.
 Dendrobium stenophytoides (P.O'Byrne & J.J.Verm.) Schuit. & Peter B.Adams
 Dendrobium stenophyton Schltr.
 Dendrobium stenopterum (Rchb.f.) Chadim
 Dendrobium stictanthum Schltr.
 Dendrobium stipiticola Ormerod
 Dendrobium stockelbuschii Schettler
 Dendrobium stockeri T.Yukawa
 Dendrobium stolleanum Schltr.
 Dendrobium stratiotes Rchb.f.
 Dendrobium straussianum Schltr.
 Dendrobium strebloceras Rchb.f.
 Dendrobium strepsiceros J.J.Sm.
 Dendrobium striatellum Carr
 Dendrobium striatiflorum J.J.Sm.
 Dendrobium stricticalcarum W.Suarez & Cootes
 Dendrobium striolatum Rchb.f. – streaked rock orchid
 Dendrobium strongylanthum Rchb.f.
 Dendrobium strongyloflorum J.J.Wood
 Dendrobium stuposum Lindl.
 Dendrobium suavicans J.M.H.Shaw
 Dendrobium subacaule Reinw. ex Lindl.
 Dendrobium subansiriense D.Verma & Barbhuiya
 Dendrobium subbilobatum Schltr.
 Dendrobium subcarinatum Ormerod
 Dendrobium subclausum Rolfe
 Dendrobium subclausum var. pandanicola J.J.Wood
 Dendrobium subclausum var. phlox (Schltr.) J.J.Wood
 Dendrobium subclausum var. speciosum J.J.Wood
 Dendrobium subclausum var. subclausum
 Dendrobium subelobatum J.J.Sm.
 Dendrobium subfalcatum J.J.Sm.
 Dendrobium subflavidum Ridl.
 Dendrobium subintegrum (P.J.Cribb & B.A.Lewis) Schuit. & Peter B.Adams
 Dendrobium sublobatum J.J.Sm.
 Dendrobium subpandifolium J.J.Sm.
 Dendrobium subpetiolatum Schltr.
 Dendrobium subquadratum J.J.Sm.
 Dendrobium subradiatum J.J.Sm.
 Dendrobium subretusum J.J.Sm.
 Dendrobium subserratum Schltr.
 Dendrobium subtricostatum J.J.Sm.
 Dendrobium subulatoides Schltr.
 Dendrobium subulatum (Blume) Lindl.
 Dendrobium subuliferum J.J.Sm.
 Dendrobium × suffusum Cady
 Dendrobium sulcatum Lindl.
 Dendrobium sulphureum Schltr.
 Dendrobium sulphureum var. cellulosum (J.J.Sm.) T.M.Reeve & P.Woods
 Dendrobium sulphureum var. rigidifolium T.M.Reeve & P.Woods
 Dendrobium sulphureum var. sulphureum
 Dendrobium summerhayesianum A.D.Hawkes & A.H.Heller
 Dendrobium superans J.J.Sm.
 Dendrobium × superbiens Rchb.f.
 Dendrobium × superbiens nothovar. superbiens
 Dendrobium × superbiens nothovar. vinicolor (St.Cloud) Ormerod
 Dendrobium sutepense Rolfe ex Downie
 Dendrobium sutiknoi (P.O'Byrne
 Dendrobium suzukii T.Yukawa
 Dendrobium swartzii A.D.Hawkes & A.H.Heller
 Dendrobium sylvanum Rchb.f.

T

 Dendrobium taniocaule Schuit., Juswara & Droissart
 Dendrobium takadui (Schltr.) J.J.Sm.
 Dendrobium tampangii P.O'Byrne
 Dendrobium tangerinum P.J.Cribb
 Dendrobium tanjiewhoei J.J.Wood & C.L.Chan
 Dendrobium tapiniense T.M.Reeve
 Dendrobium taurinum Lindl.
 Dendrobium taurulinum J.J.Sm.
 Dendrobium taveuniense  Dauncey & P.J.Cribb
 Dendrobium tawauense J.J.Wood
 Dendrobium taylorii (F.Muell.) F.M.Bailey – smooth burr orchid
 Dendrobium teloense J.J.Sm.
 Dendrobium tenellum (Blume) Lindl.
 Dendrobium tentaculatum Schltr.
 Dendrobium tenue J.J.Sm.
 Dendrobium tenuicaule Hook.f.
 Dendrobium terengganuensis Rosli & Latiff
 Dendrobium teretifolium R.Br. – thin pencil orchid
 Dendrobium terminale C.S.P.Parish & Rchb.f.
 Dendrobium terrestre J.J.Sm.
 Dendrobium tetrachromum Rchb.f.
 Dendrobium tetraedre (Blume) Lindl.
 Dendrobium tetragonum A.Cunn. ex Lindl. – tree spider orchid
 Dendrobium tetragonum var. cacatua (D.L.Jones & M.A.Clem.) H.Mohr – yellow tree spider orchid
 Dendrobium tetragonum subsp. cataractarum Peter B.Adams, S.D.Lawson & G.A.Peterson
 Dendrobium tetragonum subsp. giganteum (Leaney) Peter B.Adams - blotched tree spider orchid
 Dendrobium tetragonum subsp. melaleucaphilum (D.L.Jones & M.A.Clem.) Dockrill – flared tree spider orchid
 Dendrobium tetragonum subsp. serpentis Peter B.Adams
 Dendrobium tetragonum subsp. tetragonum - banded tree spider orchid
 Dendrobium tetralobatum (P.O'Byrne & J.J.Verm.) Schuit. & Peter B.Adams
 Dendrobium tetralobum Schltr.
 Dendrobium textile J.J.Sm.
 Dendrobium textile var. haematostictum (P.O'Byrne & J.J.Verm.) Schuit. & Peter B.Adams
 Dendrobium textile var. textile
 Dendrobium thinii Aver.
 Dendrobium thyrsiflorum B.S.Williams
 Dendrobium thyrsiflorum var. minutiflorum Aver.
 Dendrobium thyrsiflorum var. thyrsiflorum
 Dendrobium thyrsodes Rchb.f.
 Dendrobium thysanophorum Schltr.
 Dendrobium tiongii Cootes
 Dendrobium tipula J.J.Sm.
 Dendrobium tipuliferum Rchb.f.
 Dendrobium tobaense J.J.Wood & J.B.Comber
 Dendrobium tokai Rchb.f.
 Dendrobium tomaniense J.J.Wood
 Dendrobium toppiorum A.L.Lamb & J.J.Wood
 Dendrobium toppiorum subsp. taitayorum (P.O'Byrne
 Dendrobium toppiorum subsp. toppiorum
 Dendrobium torajaense P.O'Byrne
 Dendrobium toressae (F.M.Bailey) Dockrill – sparkle orchid, mica orchid
 Dendrobium torquisepalum Kraenzl.
 Dendrobium torricellense Schltr.
 Dendrobium tortile Lindl.
 Dendrobium tortitepalum J.J.Sm.
 Dendrobium toxopei J.J.Sm.
 Dendrobium tozerense Lavarack – white gemini orchid
 Dendrobium trachythece Schltr.
 Dendrobium trankimianum T.Yukawa
 Dendrobium transparens Wall. ex Lindl.
 Dendrobium transtilliferum J.J.Sm.
 Dendrobium transversilobum J.J.Sm.
 Dendrobium treacherianum Rchb.f. ex Hook.f.
 Dendrobium treubii J.J.Sm.
 Dendrobium treutleri (Hook.f.) Schuit. & Peter B.Adams
 Dendrobium triangulum J.J.Sm.
 Dendrobium tricallosum Ames & C.Schweinf.
 Dendrobium trichosepalum Gilli
 Dendrobium trichostomum Rchb.f. ex Oliv.
 Dendrobium tricristatum Schuit. & Peter B.Adams
 Dendrobium tricuspe (Blume) Lindl.
 Dendrobium tridentatum Ames & C.Schweinf.
 Dendrobium tridentiferum Lindl.
 Dendrobium triflorum (Blume) Lindl.
 Dendrobium trifurcatum (Carr) Schuit. & Peter B.Adams
 Dendrobium trigonellodorum Kraenzl.
 Dendrobium trigonopus Rchb.f.
 Dendrobium trilamellatum J.J.Sm. – fragrant tea tree orchid, large tea tree orchid
 Dendrobium trilobulatum Kores
 Dendrobium trinervium Ridl.
 Dendrobium triquetrum Ridl.
 Dendrobium triste Schltr.
 Dendrobium tropaeoliflorum Hook.f.
 Dendrobium tropidophorum Schltr.
 Dendrobium trullatum J.J.Wood & A.L.Lamb
 Dendrobium truncatum Lindl.
 Dendrobium truncicola Schltr.
 Dendrobium tsangianum (Ormerod) Schuit. & Peter B.Adams
 Dendrobium tsii Schuit. & Peter B.Adams
 Dendrobium tuberculatum J.J.Sm.
 Dendrobium tubiflorum J.J.Sm.
 Dendrobium tuensangense Odyuo & C.Deori
 Dendrobium tunense J.J.Sm.

U

 Dendrobium uliginosum J.J.Sm.
 Dendrobium umbellatum (Gaudich.) Rchb.f.
 Dendrobium umbonatum Seidenf.
 Dendrobium uncatum Lindl.
 Dendrobium uncipes J.J.Sm.
 Dendrobium undatialatum Schltr.
 Dendrobium unibulbe (Seidenf.) Schuit. & Peter B.Adams
 Dendrobium unicarinatum Kores
 Dendrobium unicorne Ames
 Dendrobium unicum Seidenf.
 Dendrobium uniflorum Griff.
 Dendrobium × usitae T.Yukawa
 Dendrobium usterii Schltr.
 Dendrobium usterioides Ames
 Dendrobium ustulatum Carr
 Dendrobium utile J.J.Sm.

V

 Dendrobium vagabundum A.D.Hawkes & A.H.Heller
 Dendrobium vagans Schltr.
 Dendrobium validicolle J.J.Sm.
 Dendrobium vanderwateri Ridl.
 Dendrobium vandifolium Finet
 Dendrobium vandoides Schltr.
 Dendrobium vanhulstijnii J.J.Sm.
 Dendrobium vanilliodorum J.J.Sm.
 Dendrobium vanleeuwenii J.J.Sm.
 Dendrobium vannouhuysii J.J.Sm.
 Dendrobium vannouhuysii var. rhombipetalum J.J.Sm.
 Dendrobium vannouhuysii var. vannouhuysii
 Dendrobium vanuatuense (Seidenf.) Schuit. & Peter B.Adams
 Dendrobium velutinelabrum M.A.Clem. & Cootes
 Dendrobium ventricosum Kraenzl.
 Dendrobium ventrilabium J.J.Sm.
 Dendrobium venustum Teijsm. & Binn.
 Dendrobium vernicosum Schltr.
 Dendrobium verruciferum Rchb.f.
 Dendrobium verruciflorum Schltr.
 Dendrobium verruculosum Schltr.
 Dendrobium versicolor Cogn.
 Dendrobium versteegii J.J.Sm.
 Dendrobium vesiculosumM.A.Clem. & D.L.Jones
 Dendrobium vestigiiferum J.J.Sm.
 Dendrobium × vexabile Rchb.f.
 Dendrobium vexillarius J.J.Sm.
 Dendrobium vexillarius var. albiviride (P.Royen) T.M.Reeve & P.Woods
 Dendrobium vexillarius var. elworthyi T.M.Reeve & P.Woods
 Dendrobium vexillarius var. hansmeyerense Howcroft & W.N.Takeuchi
 Dendrobium vexillarius var. microblepharum (Schltr.) T.M.Reeve & P.Woods
 Dendrobium vexillarius var. minor (P.Royen) Ormerod
 Dendrobium vexillarius var. retroflexum (J.J.Sm.) T.M.Reeve & P.Woods
 Dendrobium vexillarius var. uncinatum (Schltr.) T.M.Reeve & P.Woods
 Dendrobium vexillarius var. vexillarius
 Dendrobium victoriae-reginae Loher
 Dendrobium vietnamense Aver.
 Dendrobium villosulum Wall. ex Lindl.
 Dendrobium vinosum Schltr.
 Dendrobium violaceoflavens J.J.Sm.
 Dendrobium violaceominiatum Schltr.
 Dendrobium violaceopictum Schltr.
 Dendrobium violaceum Kraenzl.
 Dendrobium violaceum ssp. cyperifolium (Schltr.) T.M.Reeve & P.Woods
 Dendrobium violaceum ssp. violaceum
 Dendrobium violascens J.J.Sm.
 Dendrobium virgineum Rchb.f.
 Dendrobium viridiflorum F.M.Bailey
 Dendrobium viridulum Ridl.
 Dendrobium virotii Guillaumin.
 Dendrobium vitiense Rolfe
 Dendrobium vogelsangii P.O'Byrne
 Dendrobium × vonpaulsenianum A.D.Hawkes
 Dendrobium vonroemeri J.J.Sm.

W

 Dendrobium wangliangii G.W.Hu, C.L.Long & X.H.Jin
 Dendrobium wantipiense Ormerod
 Dendrobium wardianum Warner
 Dendrobium wassellii S.T.Blake – furrowed pencil orchid
 Dendrobium wattii (Hook.f.) Rchb.f.
 Dendrobium wekainense Ormerod
 Dendrobium wenshanense Q.Xu, Y.B.Luo & Z.J.Liu
 Dendrobium wentianum J.J.Sm.
 Dendrobium wenzelii Ames
 Dendrobium whistleri P.J.Cribb
 Dendrobium whichersii Schltr.
 Dendrobium widjajanum Ormerod
 Dendrobium wightii A.D.Hawkes & A.H.Heller
 Dendrobium wildianum (Rolfe & Downie) Tang & F.T.Wang
 Dendrobium williamsianum Rchb.f.
 Dendrobium williamsianum var. chanii McCraith
 Dendrobium williamsianum var. williamsianum
 Dendrobium williamsonii Alva George DayDay & Rchb.f.
 Dendrobium wilsonii Rolfe
 Dendrobium wisselense P.J.Cribb
 Dendrobium wolterianum Schltr.
 Dendrobium woluense J.J.Sm.
 Dendrobium womersleyi T.M.Reeve
 Dendrobium womersleyi var. autophilum Dauncey
 Dendrobium womersleyi var. womersleyi
 Dendrobium woodsii P.J.Cribb
 Dendrobium wulaiense Howcroft

X

 Dendrobium xanthoacron Schltr.
 Dendrobium xanthocaulon Schltr.
 Dendrobium xanthocheilum Aver.
 Dendrobium xanthogenium Schltr.
 Dendrobium xantholeucum Rchb.f..
 Dendrobium xanthomeson Schltr.
 Dendrobium xanthophlebium Lindl.
 Dendrobium xanthothece Schltr.
 Dendrobium xichouensis S.J.Cheng & Z.Z.Tang
 Dendrobium xiphophyllum Schltr.
 Dendrobium xylophyllum Kraenzl.

Y

 Dendrobium yeageri Ames & Quisumb.
 Dendrobium × yengiliense T.M.Reeve
 Dendrobium yondaliae Ormerod
 Dendrobium yongii J.J.Wood
 Dendrobium ypsilon Seidenf.
 Dendrobium yulianiae Schuit. & P.O'Byrne

Z
 

 Dendrobium zamboangense Ames & Quisumb.
 Dendrobium zebrinum J.J.Sm.
 Dendrobium zhenghuoense S.P.Chen, Liang Ma & M.He Li
 Dendrobium zhenyuanense D.P.Ye ex Jian W.Li, D.P.Ye & X.H.Jin

References

External links 

Lists of plant species